The commune of Kinyinya is a commune of Ruyigi Province in eastern Burundi. The capital lies at Kinyinya.

References

Communes of Burundi
Ruyigi Province